Graford is a town in Palo Pinto County, Texas, United States. The population was 584 at the 2010 census.

Geography

Graford is located at  (32.937921, –98.247896).

Demographics

As of the census of 2000, 578 people, 213 households, and 145 families resided in the city. The population density was 819.9 people per square mile (318.8/km). The 238 housing units averaged 337.6 per square mile (131.3/km). The racial makeup of the city was 94.64% White, 0.69% Native American, 3.63% from other races, and 1.04% from two or more races. Hispanics or Latinos of any race were 4.84% of the population.

Of the 213 households, 36.6% had children under the age of 18 living with them, 58.2% were married couples living together, 8.5% had a female householder with no husband present, and 31.5% were not families. About 26.8% of all households were made up of individuals, and 14.6% had someone living alone who was 65 years of age or older. The average household size was 2.71 and the average family size was 3.38.

In the city, the population was distributed as 30.1% under the age of 18, 7.3% from 18 to 24, 27.9% from 25 to 44, 23.2% from 45 to 64, and 11.6% who were 65 years of age or older. The median age was 34 years. For every 100 females, there were 104.2 males. For every 100 females age 18 and over, there were 94.2 males.

The median income for a household in the city was $30,972, and for a family was $33,676. Males had a median income of $25,885 versus $18,182 for females. The per capita income for the city was $12,648. About 9.1% of families and 12.1% of the population were below the poverty line, including 10.6% of those under age 18 and 19.7% of those age 65 or over.

Education
The City of Graford is served by the Graford Independent School District and home to the Graford High School Jackrabbits.

Notable people

 Billy Gillispie, head coach of the Tarleton State men's basketball team, former coach of the University of Kentucky, Texas A&M University, and Texas Tech University's men's basketball teams.
 Glenn Rogers, Republican member of the Texas House of Representatives from District 60 (2021–Present)

References

Cities in Texas
Cities in Palo Pinto County, Texas